Anaglyptus is a genus of beetles in the family Cerambycidae. The scientific name of the genus was first validly published in 1839 by Mulsant.

Species 
The following species are accepted within Anaglyptus:

Anaglyptus abieticola Holzschuh, 2003
Anaglyptus ambiguus Holzschuh, 1992
Anaglyptus annulicornis (Pic, 1933)
Anaglyptus arabicus (Küster, 1847)
Anaglyptus arakawae (Kano, 1933)
Anaglyptus arcanus Miroshnikov, Bi & Lin, 2014
Anaglyptus baeticus Verdugo, Lencina & Baena, 2019
Anaglyptus bellus Matsumura & Matsushita, 1933
Anaglyptus bicallosus (Kraatz, 1882)
Anaglyptus colobotheoides Bates, 1884
Anaglyptus confusus Holzschuh, 1999
Anaglyptus croesus Pesarini & Sabbadini, 1997
Anaglyptus danilevskii Miroshnikov, 2000
Anaglyptus decemmaculatus Gressitt, 1935
Anaglyptus dolosulus Holzschuh, 2006
Anaglyptus elegantulus Miroshnikov, Bi & Lin, 2014
Anaglyptus fasciatus Thomson, 1857
Anaglyptus flavus Viktora, Tichý & Rapuzzi, 2013
Anaglyptus ganglbaueri Reitter, 1886
Anaglyptus gibbosus (Fabricius, 1787)
Anaglyptus graphellus Holzschuh, 2011
Anaglyptus gressitti Holzschuh, 1999
Anaglyptus higashiyamai Makihara & Hayashi, 1987
Anaglyptus hilari Castelnau & Gory, 1841
Anaglyptus humerosus Chevrolat, 1863
Anaglyptus isolatus Gressitt, 1951
Anaglyptus kabakovi Miroshnikov, 2015
Anaglyptus kanssuensis Ganglbauer, 1889
Anaglyptus kontumensis Viktora, 2019
Anaglyptus lizhigangi Bi & Niisato, 2018
Anaglyptus longispinis (Gardner, 1939)
Anaglyptus luteofasciatus Pic, 1905
Anaglyptus malickyi Holzschuh, 1991
Anaglyptus marmoratus (Holzschuh, 1982)
Anaglyptus matsushitai Hayashi, 1955
Anaglyptus meridionalis Matsushita, 1933
Anaglyptus miroshnikovi Tichý & Lin, 2021
Anaglyptus mysticoides Reitter, 1894
Anaglyptus mysticus (Linné, 1758)
Anaglyptus niponensis Bates, 1884
Anaglyptus nokasanus Kano, 1930
Anaglyptus petrae Viktora & Liu, 2018
Anaglyptus praecellens Holzschuh, 1981
Anaglyptus producticollis Gressitt, 1951
Anaglyptus qijuni Viktora & Liu, 2018
Anaglyptus residuus Holzschuh, 2010
Anaglyptus rufobasalis Tippmann, 1955
Anaglyptus rufogriseus (Pic, 1928)
Anaglyptus sericellus Holzschuh & Lin, 2015
Anaglyptus simplicicornis Reitter, 1906
Anaglyptus subfasciatus Pic, 1906
Anaglyptus tersus Viktora & Tichý, 2015
Anaglyptus tichyi Miroshnikov, Bi & Lin, 2014
Anaglyptus trocolii Miroshnikov, 2015
Anaglyptus ulmiphilus (Holzschuh, 1982)
Anaglyptus vicinulus Holzschuh, 1999
Anaglyptus watsoni (Gahan, 1906)
Anaglyptus yakushimanus Hayashi, 1968
Anaglyptus zappii Rapuzzi & Sama, 2014

References

Cerambycidae
Beetles described in 1839
Cerambycidae genera